Olaf Janßen (born 8 October 1966) is a retired German footballer and manager of Viktoria Köln, who played as a midfielder.

Club career
Janßen spent most of his playing career with German Bundesliga sides 1. FC Köln and Eintracht Frankfurt, where he later worked as a scout.

In September 2013 he was appointed as manager of Dynamo Dresden, but was sacked after nine months on the job.

In June 2016 Janßen became assistant coach to VfB Stuttgart head coach Jos Luhukay. From 15 to 20 September 2016 he was caretaker manager of the club. Janßen took on a new role as scout of VfB Stuttgart and left the coaching staff after the appointment of the new head coach Hannes Wolf.

For the 2017–18 season, he was appointed as the head coach of FC St. Pauli. He was sacked on 7 December 2017.

In January 2018 he became new manager of FC Viktoria Köln replacing Marco Antwerpen. He returned to Cologne on 1 February 2021.

International career
Janßen played for West Germany at the 1988 Summer Olympics in Seoul.

Career statistics

References

External links

1966 births
Living people
Sportspeople from Krefeld
German footballers
Footballers from North Rhine-Westphalia
Association football midfielders
Germany under-21 international footballers
Olympic medalists in football
Olympic footballers of West Germany
West German footballers
Olympic bronze medalists for West Germany
Footballers at the 1988 Summer Olympics
Medalists at the 1988 Summer Olympics
Bundesliga players
2. Bundesliga players
Swiss Super League players
KFC Uerdingen 05 players
1. FC Köln players
Eintracht Frankfurt players
AC Bellinzona players
German football managers
2. Bundesliga managers
3. Liga managers
Dynamo Dresden managers
VfB Stuttgart managers
FC St. Pauli managers
FC Viktoria Köln managers
German expatriate footballers
German expatriate sportspeople in Switzerland
Expatriate footballers in Switzerland